Joseph Anthony Cox (born November 27, 1986) is an American football coach and former college football quarterback. He played college football for four seasons at the University of Georgia, and was the team's starting quarterback for the 2009 season.

Early years
Cox started at Independence High School in Charlotte, North Carolina. Cox was named to the 2004 Parade Magazine All-America Team and Super Prep All-Mid Atlantic Team.  He was the North Carolina Gatorade Player of the Year. Cox was on the AP first-team All-State team and was a two-time Charlotte Observer Offensive Player of the Year. He also played in the Shrine Bowl of the Carolinas and impressed scouts by going 31–0 as a starting quarterback.  Cox was a two-time team captain and was the number 7 rated quarterback in the country by Rivals.com and Tom Lemming of ESPN. He set a North Carolina record with 66 touchdown passes while taking his team to its fifth consecutive state championship his senior year.  Cox was named the MVP of the state title game twice. As a junior, Cox threw for nearly 4,000 yards and over 40 touchdowns.  As a senior, he completed 240 out of 363 passes for over 4,500 yards and only five interceptions.

College career

2005–2008
Cox was redshirted his freshman year in 2005. Through the first four years of his career at the University of Georgia, Cox had scattered playing time and completed 33 out of 58 pass attempts for 432 yards with five touchdowns and one interception. As a redshirt freshman in 2006, with Georgia trailing Colorado 0–13 at home late in the third quarter, Cox was put in the game to relieve ineffective starter Matthew Stafford. Cox threw for 153 yards and two touchdowns late in the game to lead Georgia to a comeback win, 14–13. Cox would start one more game in the season, in a 14–9 victory over Ole Miss, but eventually lost his starting job to the highly touted Stafford, who ended up being the first overall pick in the 2009 NFL Draft.

2009
While Cox threw for over 1,200 yards and 11 touchdowns and boasted a 146.4 quarterback rating in his first four games of the 2009 season, he did not perform as well in the next few games. Georgia finished 8–5 on the season with Cox as the starter. In Georgia's 52–41 win over Arkansas in Fayetteville, Cox threw for a career-high 375 yards and matched a school record with five touchdown passes. Against #1-ranked Florida, Cox completed 11-of-20 pass attempts for two touchdowns, which was as many as the Gators had allowed all season, but also threw three interceptions in the 17–41 loss. In his final game at Sanford Stadium, the Bulldogs had a 14-point half-time lead. However, Cox threw two interceptions in the fourth quarter. Along with a red-zone fumble (as Georgia was attempting to tie the game), these interceptions sealed a loss against Kentucky, Georgia's first home loss to the Wildcats since 1977. However, Cox was not asked to do much in the final regular season game against #7-ranked Georgia Tech. With Bulldog tailbacks Caleb King and Washaun Ealey combining for 349 rushing yards, Cox managed the game well, completing 8-of-14 passes for just 76 yards and a touchdown in Georgia's 30–24 victory.

Coaching career

In June 2013, Joe Cox joined the coaching staff  at Mallard Creek High School in Charlotte, NC, as the quarterbacks position coach. On December 14, 2013, the Mallard Creek team won its first state championship. In 2014, he became the offensive coordinator for Mallard Creek and led the Maverick offense to its second state title on December 13, 2014.

On February 3, 2015, it was publicly announced that Joe Cox had left Mallard Creek High School to become a graduate assistant for the Colorado State Rams. In January 2016, Cox was promoted to tight ends coach for Colorado State.

On January 10, 2020, it was publicly announced that Joe Cox had joined the coaching staff of the South Carolina Gamecocks football as Tight Ends Coach. 

Following the departure of former Offensive Coordinator/Wide Receivers coach Bryan McClendon to Oregon, Will Muschamp moved Bobby Bentley back to tight ends and Cox was moved to wide receivers.  

In December 2020, new South Carolina head coach Shane Beamer announced a new slate of coaching hires, and that Cox would not be retained  Cox was replaced by former Arkansas wide receivers coach Justin Stepp.

On February 15, 2021 Cox was named the Charlotte 49ers' Tight Ends coach.

On February 4, 2022, Cox was named tight ends coach for the University of Alabama <rolltidewire.usatoday.com> .

References

1986 births
Living people
Sportspeople from Charlotte, North Carolina
Players of American football from Charlotte, North Carolina
Coaches of American football from North Carolina
American football quarterbacks
Georgia Bulldogs football players
High school football coaches in North Carolina
Colorado State Rams football coaches
South Carolina Gamecocks football coaches
Charlotte 49ers football coaches